Events during the year 1108 in Italy.

Events
 Bergamo is first mentioned as an independent republic.

Deaths
 Enrico Contarini
 Gregory III, Count of Tusculum

Sources

Years of the 12th century in Italy
Italy
Italy